The Rarities is the eighth compilation album by American singer-songwriter Mariah Carey, released on October 2, 2020, by Columbia and Legacy Recordings. It is a part of "#MC30", a promotional campaign marking the 30th anniversary of Carey's self-titled debut studio album, Mariah Carey (1990), and coincides with her memoir The Meaning of Mariah Carey (2020). Featuring previously unreleased material "with personal relevance and meaning" to Carey—some of which are discussed in her memoir—the album also includes a second disc consisting of audio from her March 7, 1996, live performance at the Tokyo Dome during her Daydream World Tour. A Blu-ray disc featuring enhanced video footage from the concert was released exclusively in Japan.

Background 

To celebrate and promote the 30th anniversary of her self-titled debut studio album, Mariah Carey and her memoir The Meaning of Mariah Carey, Carey announced the release of her eighth compilation album. Carey stated on Good Morning America that,
"Basically, I found stuff in my vault that I had either started to work on a long time ago and never released or that I wanted to finish mixing or do whatever. But they're songs that have previously not been released."

Music and content 
The album consists of a 15-track collection of unreleased songs, B-sides, demos and live performances. The album also features Carey's Daydream World Tour concert at the Tokyo Dome, recorded in March 1996, which includes live renditions from her hits, including "Emotions", "Fantasy", "One Sweet Day", "Vision of Love", "Hero", "All I Want for Christmas Is You", among others.

The album begins with "Here We Go Around Again" in which Idolator writer Mike Wass stated was "hard to understand how something this effortlessly charming and catchy didn’t make the tracklist of Mariah’s debut album." Carey channeled the Jackson 5 on this "buoyant bop from 1990, sounding so innocent that she can barely contain the sheer joy of relishing in her own melismatic powers." "Can You Hear Me" was described as "a stunning ballad, and was originally penned for Emotions (1991)". Carey has stated that the song was also written for Barbra Streisand. The previously released B-side songs include "Do You Think of Me" which was featured on the B-side of Carey's "Dreamlover", "Slipping Away" on the B-side of "Always Be My Baby" and "Everything Fades Away" on the B-side of "Hero" and also included as a bonus track on international editions of Carey's third studio album, Music Box (1993). The three B-sides were described as "legendary within The Lambily for good reason".

"All I Live For", a Music Box reject, was described as "90s R&B-lite". Carey's work on "One Night" was also an "urban groove that probably scared the execs at Columbia at the time" and was "one of Mariah’s first collaborations with Jermaine Dupri, a creative relationship that would bear a lot of fruit in coming years." Carey's cover of Irene Cara’s "Out Here on My Own" was described as being "heaven-sent and, thematically, it makes complete sense for [Carey]." The song is a piano ballad. "Loverboy" was previously released on Carey's Glitter soundtrack in 2001 and The Rarities features an original mix of the song which samples the 1978 Yellow Magic Orchestra song "Firecracker", which is said to have sparked the feud between Carey and Jennifer Lopez. "I Pray" was described by The New York Post writer Chuck Arnold, as "one of the most straight-up spiritual things Carey has ever done, with a choir helping her to take it all the way to church." "Cool On You" continues the R&B sound and "stems from E=MC² era and finds [Carey] in full club mode [...] It's light and feathery fun that gets stuck in your head after the very first listen." "Mesmerized" is a "curiously sedate mid-tempo that was supposed to appear in The Paperboy."

Along with the live performance at the Dome, the album also features a live rendition of the jazz ballad, "Lullaby of Birdland", in which Carey performed live at The Elusive Chanteuse Show in 2014 and was originally meant to feature on her album, Me. I Am Mariah... The Elusive Chanteuse (2014) which was then titled The Art of Letting Go. The lead single "Save the Day" with Ms. Lauryn Hill was "as timely as a song that was written in 2011 can be" and met with mixed reviews. One of the higher praised songs on the album was a 2020 re-recording of Carey's "Close My Eyes" from her album Butterfly (1997) which was described as a "real jewel in the crown" and that "few songs capture the power of the superstar’s voice and pen as well as this."

Promotion 
On August 19, 2020, Carey announced the pre-order of The Rarities on her social media platforms, along with its release date of October 2, 2020. She performed "Vision of Love" and "Close My Eyes" during the Good Morning America concert series. On September 12, 2020, a music video was released for "Save the Day" to commemorate female tennis players. Upon release of the album, Carey released her full concert at the Tokyo Dome on her Vevo channel. On October 23, 2020, to further promote "Save the Day", Carey released a lyric video for the song which encouraged viewers to vote as well as paying tribute to "Breonna Taylor, Congressman John Lewis, trans activist and writer Raquel Willis, Sojourner Truth, Fredrick Douglass, and essential workers on the frontlines of the pandemic, with portraits drawn by artist Molly Crabapple."

#MC30 
In the weeks leading up to the album, Carey released "digital EPs, remixes, bonus cuts, rare tracks, a cappella renditions and live performances" from her discography under the coined hashtag "#MC30". Her first release was on July 17, 2020 where she released a digital-only EP, The Live Debut – 1990, which featured a live performance from Carey's debut showcase at New York City's Club Tatou on October 22, 1990.

To further promote her 30th anniversary and the release of The Rarities, Carey released EP remixes of her songs: "There's Got to Be a Way", "Someday", "Emotions", "Make It Happen", "Dreamlover", "Never Forget You", "Anytime You Need a Friend", "Fantasy", "One Sweet Day", "Always Be My Baby", "Underneath the Stars", "Honey", "Butterfly", "The Roof", "Breakdown", "My All", "Sweetheart", "I Still Believe" and "Theme from Mahogany (Do You Know Where You're Going To)". She also released a Spanish EP titled Mariah en Español featuring Spanish versions of her songs "My All", "Open Arms" and "Hero". After the release of the album, Carey picked up at where she left off on her "#MC30" campaign and released EP remixes for "Heartbreaker", "Can't Take That Away (Mariah's Theme)", "Thank God I Found You" and "Against All Odds (Take a Look at Me Now)".

Among music releases, Carey has also released her live video performances on her Vevo channel from BBC One's Top of the Pops along with what Billboard described as "spruced-up" versions of her album discography in vinyl format. On November 13, 2020, Carey released an unreleased music video for "Underneath the Stars" filmed in 1996 and teased months earlier for "#MC30" on Carey's Instagram. In 2021, she resumed "#MC30" releases with EP's for the songs "Through the Rain", "Boy (I Need You)", "I Only Wanted", "The One", "Bringin' On the Heartbreak", "It's Like That", "We Belong Together", "Shake It Off", "Don't Forget About Us", "Say Somethin'", "Your Girl", "Touch My Body", "I Stay in Love", "I'll Be Lovin' U Long Time", "I'm That Chick" and "Joy to the World".

Singles 
The album's lead single, "Save the Day", was released on August 21, 2020. The song charted at number 12 on Billboard's US Hot R&B Songs. "Out Here on My Own" was released as the second single on September 18, 2020. The album's third single, a limited edition cassette single for "Here We Go Around Again" with "Loverboy (Firecracker – Original Version)" as a B-side was released in Japan on December 11, 2020. The double-sided single charted at number 59 in Japan for a week on December 21, 2020.

Critical reception 

Upon release, the compilation album received generally positive reviews. On the review aggregator website Metacritic the album has a score of a 74 out of 100 based on reviews from 6 critics. Variety writer Jeremy Helligar gave the album high praise stating that, "unlike many of the pop queens that followed her up the charts, Carey can craft a hit without a cast of millions [...] and even as she switches up her emphasis from crossover pop to hip hop to adult soul, there’s a common thread of Mariah-ness running through everything." He gave praise to Carey's 2020 rendition of her classic, "Close My Eyes" from her sixth studio album Butterfly stating that, "Her vocals [...] are lovely and understated, even when she’s hitting her legendary whistle notes. He went on to say negatively that, "there are a few clunkers like her messy live take on the jazz classic "Lullaby of Birdland" [...] there should be a method to the madness. Unfortunately, Mariah's take on jazz chanteuse is more madness than method; suffice it to say she's no Sarah Vaughan." He also criticized "Save the Day" stating that "Ms. Lauryn Hill’s vocals have been cleverly interpolated" but called it a "rare lyrical misstep" saying that "what the world needs now is something more probing and specific than another string of peace homilies."

Los Angeles Times pop-music critic Mikael Wood also praised the album stating that the only negative aspect was that it did not "include anything from the out-of-print [...] alt-rock album that Carey secretly made in 1995 under the band name Chick." He praised the song "Here We Go Around Again" stating that her vocals were "precise as always" and praised her writing style saying that it was "already in a tune whose darting melody evokes the comings and goings of a guy who can’t make up his mind about her." Idolator writer Mike Wass also praised the album saying that "a collection of unreleased songs and B-Sides has no right being this good". He stated that "The Rarities is obviously essential listening for fans, but well worth diving into for general music lovers. After all, this is an important piece of pop history." NME writer Nick Levine, gave the album three out of five stars stating that the album "goes heavier on Carey's ballads than her edgier, hip-hop-influenced material of the late '90s onwards, but there's a delicious sense of revenge being served cold in the inclusion of "Loverboy" with its original sample." Rated R&B writer, Keithan Samuels, gave the album honourable mention on the publication's 30 Best R&B Albums of 2020 list. He stated, "Since her introduction, Carey has released songs that have shifted culture and have been the soundtrack to many of our lives [...] With The Rarities, Carey flips the script and allows the world to access the secret soundtrack that she has been curating unobtrusively." In describing the album, The Cavalier Daily writer Darryle Aldridge stated that it "lets fans and critics into a glimpse of [Carey's] true self, particularly the R&B siren that masqueraded as a tight-laced girl-next-door during her reign in the ‘90s." He went on to say that the album "is prime Mariah without the glitz, glamour or melodramatic flairs that shot her to fame."

Commercial performance 
In the United States, The Rarities debuted and peaked at number 31 on the Billboard 200 chart with 21,000 album equivalent units, 14,800 units are pure album sales. The album also debuted on Billboards Top R&B/Hip-Hop Albums at number 15. On the UK Albums chart, the album debuted at number 44. The album also debuted and peaked inside the top-twenty in Australia and Spain, the top-thirty in Japan, Scotland and Switzerland, and the top-forty in Belgium, Croatia and Poland.

 Track listing 
Credits from the album's liner notes.Notes signifies a co-producer
 signifies a musical directorSample credits'
 "Loverboy" contains a sample of "Firecracker" by the Yellow Magic Orchestra (1978).
 "Save the Day" contains elements of "Killing Me Softly" by the Fugees (1996).
 "Fantasy" contains a sample and interpolation of "Genius of Love" by Tom Tom Club (1981).
 "Dreamlover" contains a sample of "Blind Alley" by The Emotions (1972).

Charts

Weekly charts

Year-end charts

References 

2020 compilation albums
Mariah Carey compilation albums